Folch de Cardona (or Cardona or Incardona in Sicily) is a Spanish noble family of Catalan origin, directly descended from the French royal family and second only in importance to the royal family of Aragon.

External links

Spanish noble families